Ahsanollah Shirkavand (born 18 March 1981 in Varamin) is an Iranian volleyball libero. After playing at the Asian Youth Games, he was invited to the Iran Men's National Volleyball Team and played for it from 1998 to 2000 who finished fourth at the Asian Men's Volleyball Championship. Shirkavand continued playing for the National Team under the coaching of Julio Velasco until 2013, when he was forced to leave national games due to injury.

Clubs 
Bazyaft-e Tehran, Bargh Tehran, Paykan Tehran (seven years in total), Saipa Alborz (two years), Sanam Tehran (two years),   Persepolis (one year), Petrochimi Mahshahr (one year),  Shahrdari Urmia (one year), Shahrdari Varamin (three years).

Shirkavand started his national professional career with Iran's men's Iran men's national under-19 volleyball teamUnder-19, Under-21, and finally with the National team.
He has finished first with Paykan Club three times and with Sanam Tehran once, while finishing second with Shahrdari Varamin twice. Among other titles gained by him are a second place with Sanam Tehran and a third place with Shahrdari Urmia.

Honours
Starting with Persepolis Club in Tehran in 1995, Shirkavand has played for a number of Iranian clubs.

National team
Asian Games
: Busan, South Korea, 2002
Asian Championship
:Tianjin, China, 2003
Asian Cup
: Nakhon Ratchasima, Thailand, 2008

Club
 with Paykan Tehran:
  medal: three times at Asian Championship
  medal: one time at Asian Championship
 with Matin Varamin:
  medal: one time at Asian Championship
 with Saipa Tehran:
  medal: one time at Asian Championship
 with Paykan Tehran:
  medal: one time at World Championship (2010)
 with Paykan Tehran:
 4th place: one time at World Championship (2009)
 with Matin Varamin:
 4th place: one time at World Championship (2013)

Individual
Best Libero: 1998 Junior Championship

References

External links 

 boxscorenews.com

1981 births
Living people
Iranian men's volleyball players
People from Varamin
People from Tehran Province
Asian Games silver medalists for Iran
Asian Games medalists in volleyball
Volleyball players at the 2002 Asian Games
Medalists at the 2002 Asian Games